Cephalodia (singular cephalodium) are small gall-like structures found in some species of lichens that contain cyanobacterial symbionts.  Cephalodia can occur within the tissues of the lichen, or on its upper or lower surface.  Lichens that have both green algal and cyanobacterial symbionts restrict the cyanobacteria to cephalodia.  Lichens that have only cyanobacterial symbionts do not have cephalodia: instead the cyanobacteria are widely distributed throughout the lichen.  Lichens with cephalodia can fix nitrogen, and can be an important contributor of nitrogen to the ecosystem.

References
Brodo, I. M., S. D. Sharnoff, and S. Sharnoff. 2001. Lichens of North America. Yale University Press: New Haven.

Lichens
Fungal morphology and anatomy